CSR Sarma College Ground is a cricket ground in Ongole, Andhra Pradesh. It is owned by CSR Sharma College along with Prakasam District Cricket Association and was established in 2012. The first first-class to be played there came in the 2015 Ranji Trophy when Andhra cricket team played Tripura cricket team. Till date the ground has hosted two more first-class matches in 2015 season. The ground hosted few under-19s state matches.

The ground has pavilion with a seating capacity of 1000 along with three turfs wicket and all the modern facilities.

References

External links 

 cricketarchive
 cricinfo
 Wikimapia

Cricket grounds in Andhra Pradesh
Ongole
Multi-purpose stadiums in India
Sports venues completed in 2012
2012 establishments in Andhra Pradesh
Buildings and structures in Prakasam district